Pseudolysin (Pseudomonas elastase, Pseudomonas aeruginosa neutral metalloproteinase) is an enzyme. This enzyme catalyses the following chemical reaction

 Hydrolysis of proteins including elastin, collagen types III and IV, fibronectin and immunoglobulin A, generally with bulky hydrophobic group at P1'. Insulin B chain cleavage pattern identical to that of thermolysin, but specificity differs in other respects

This enzyme belongs to the peptidase family M4 (thermolysin family).

References

External links 
 

EC 3.4.24